Politics in Black and White: Race and Power in Los Angeles is the first book by Raphael Sonenshein. It deals with racial politics in Los Angeles.

Further reading
 Broussard, Albert S. "Politics in Black and White: Race and Power in Los Angeles" (Book Review). The Journal of American History, 1 September 1994, Vol.81(2), pp.820-821.
 Bullock,, Charles S. "Politics in Black and White: Race and Power in Los Angeles." (Book Review) Political Science Quarterly, 1 April 1994, Vol.109(1), pp.207-208.
 De Graaf, Lawrence B. "Politics in Black and White Race and Power in Los Angeles" (book review). Pacific Historical Review, Feb, 1997, Vol.66(1), p.99(3)
 Erie, Steven P. "Politics in Black and White: Race and Power in Los Angeles" (book review). American Political Science Review, Dec, 1993, Vol.87(4), p.1018(2) 
 Horne, Gerald. "Politics in Black and White: Race and Power in Los Angeles" (Book Review). California History, 1 December 1994, Vol.73(4), pp.331.
 Leonard, Kevin Allen. "Politics in Black and White: Race and Power in Los Angeles" (Book Review). The Western Historical Quarterly, 1 April 1994, Vol.25(1), pp.104-105
 Lucaites, John Louis. "Politics in Black and White: Race and Power in Los Angeles" (Brief Article). The Annals of the American Academy of Political and Social Science, July, 1994, Vol.534, p.197(2).
 Morgan, Iwan. "Politics in Black and White: Race and Power in Los Angeles" (book review). Ethnic and Racial Studies, April, 1996, Vol.19(2), p.512(3) 
 Oliver, Melvin L. "Politics in Black and White: Race and Power in Los Angeles" (Book Review). Contemporary Sociology, 1 July 1994, Vol.23(4), pp.481-482.
 Rabinowitz, Howard N. "Politics in Black and White: Race and Power in Los Angeles" (Book Review) The American Historical Review, 1 December 1994, Vol.99(5), pp.1774-1775
 Stein - Evers, Michelle. "Politics in Black and White: Race and Power in Los Angeles" (Brief Article). Black Enterprise, Jan, 1994, Vol.24(6), p.79(1).
 Wassmansdorf, Gregg and Michael Dear. "Politics in Black and White: Race and Power in Los Angeles" (book review). International Journal of Urban and Regional Research, June, 1994, Vol.18(2), p.363(2).
 "Politics in Black and White" (Book Review)(Brief Review). The Black Scholar, Summer, 1993, Vol.23(2), p.101.
 "Politics in Black and White" (Book Review). Prairie Schooner, Spring, 1994, Vol.109, p.207.

Books about politics of the United States
Books about Los Angeles